The 2017 Sarasota Open will be a professional tennis tournament played on clay courts. It will be the 9th edition of the tournament which will be part of the 2017 ATP Challenger Tour. It will take place in Sarasota, United States between 17 and 23 April.

Singles main-draw entrants

Seeds

 1 Rankings are as of April 10, 2017.

Other entrants
The following players received wildcards into the singles main draw:
  Sekou Bangoura
  Christian Harrison
  Sebastian Korda
  Mackenzie McDonald

The following players received entry into the singles main draw as special exempts:
  Andrea Arnaboldi
  Miomir Kecmanović

The following players received entry from the qualifying draw:
  Facundo Argüello
  Daniel Elahi Galán
  Blaž Rola
  João Pedro Sorgi

The following player received entry as a lucky loser:
  Stefan Kozlov

Champions

Singles

 Frances Tiafoe def.  Tennys Sandgren 6–3, 6–4.

Doubles

 Scott Lipsky /  Jürgen Melzer def.  Stefan Kozlov /  Peter Polansky 6–2, 6–4.

External links
Official Website

Sarasota Open
Sarasota Open
2017 in American tennis
2017 in sports in Florida